Leopoldo Torres is the name of:

Leopoldo Torres Ríos, Argentine film director, father
Leopoldo Torre Nilsson, Argentine film director, son
Leopoldo Torres Balbás, Spanish architect
Leopoldo Torres Boursault, Spanish politician